Louise Smith was an American NASCAR driver.

Louise Smith may also refer to:

 Louise Smith (theatre artist),  American actress and playwright
 Louise Smith (state trooper), First black woman to serve in an American state police force 
 Louise Jordan Smith (1868–1928), American painter and academic
 Louise Pettibone Smith (1887–1981), American biblical scholar, author and social activist
 Louise Setara (born 1988), née Smith, English singer-songwriter
 Louise Clappe (1819–1906), née Smith, writer
 Louise Hanson-Dyer (1884–1962), née Smith, Australian music publisher
 Louise Aloys Smith (1917–1999), American politician from Nevada
 Murder of Louise Smith (2004–2020), a 16 year old murdered in Hampshire, England

See also

 Louise Smit (born 1940), South African writer
 Mary Louise Smith (disambiguation)
 Louise (given name)
 Smith (surname)
 
 Louise (disambiguation)
 Smith (disambiguation)